"Hello" is a song by Swedish-Congolese singer Mohombi and Youssou Ndour. The song was performed for the first time in Melodifestivalen 2019, where it made it to the final, finishing in fifth place. It features on the album 'History.'

Charts

Weekly charts

Year-end charts

References

2019 singles
2019 songs
English-language Swedish songs
Melodifestivalen songs of 2019
Songs written by Thomas G:son
Songs written by Mohombi
Songs written by Linnea Deb
Songs written by Alexandru Cotoi